Loanga is a town in the Tenkodogo Department of Boulgou Province in south-eastern Burkina Faso. As of 2005, the town has a population of 2,580.

Loanga is approximately 20 km from the department capital of Tenkodogo. The economy is mainly based on animal husbandry.

References

Populated places in the Centre-Est Region
Boulgou Province